The Thomas A. Dorsey Farmhouse, at 416 High St. in Carlisle, Kentucky, was listed on the National Register of Historic Places in 1989.

It is a large two-story red brick Italianate T-plan house.  It is located in the "Dorsey's Addition" neighborhood, and it prominently overlooks East Main Street, which is two streets below.

References

Houses on the National Register of Historic Places in Kentucky
Houses completed in 1855
National Register of Historic Places in Nicholas County, Kentucky
1855 establishments in Kentucky
Italianate architecture in Kentucky
Houses in Nicholas County, Kentucky